The Āṭānāṭiya Sutta is the 32nd Sutta in the Dīgha Nikāya ("Long Discourses of Buddha") of Pāli Canon. It is a poem of spiritual protection against evil spirits and it was presented to the Buddha by one of the "Four Great Heavenly Kings", King Vessavana (Pali; Sanskrit: Vaisravana). It also contains a description of the celestial kingdoms of Four Heavenly Kings. This scripture can also be found in Dīrgha Āgama of Chinese Buddhist canon and Kangyur of Tibetan Buddhist canon.

References

Bibliography

Digha Nikaya
Four Heavenly Kings
Exorcism in Buddhism